Glen Wilton is a census-designated place (CDP) in northern Botetourt County, Virginia, United States. The population was 129 at the 2020 census. The CDP is located along the James River, between Eagle Rock and Iron Gate. It is part of the Roanoke Metropolitan Statistical Area.

History
Callie Furnace was listed on the National Register of Historic Places in 1974.

Geography
Glen Wilton is located at  (37.7554874, −079.8213753).

According to the United States Census Bureau, the CDP has a total area of 0.434 square miles.

Demographics

The community was delineated by the United States Census Bureau for the first time in 2020. 

As of the census of 2020, there were 129 people residing in the CDP. The population density was 300 people per square mile (110/km2). There were 57 housing units. The racial makeup of the CDP was 96.9% White, 2.3% Black or African American, 0% Native American, 0% Asian, 0% Pacific Islander, 0% from other races, and 0.8% from two or more races. 0% of the population were Hispanic or Latino of any race.

Government
The United States Postal Service operates the Glen Wilton Post Office within the CDP, however addresses use an Eagle Rock ZIP Code.

Law enforcement is provided by the Botetourt County Sheriff's Office. Fire protection is provided by the Glen Wilton Volunteer Fire Department and Rescue Squad, which operates a fire station within the CDP. Emergency medical services are provided by the Glen Wilton Volunteer Fire Department and Rescue Squad at a non-transport, basic life support level and the Eagle Rock Volunteer Rescue Squad and Botetourt County Department of Fire and EMS at the advanced life support and transport levels.

Education
Glen Wilton is served by Botetourt County Public Schools. Public school students residing in Glen Wilton are zoned to attend Eagle Rock Elementary School, Central Academy Middle School, and James River High School.

Mountain Gateway Community College in nearby Clifton Forge is the closest higher education institution to the CDP.

Infrastructure
The Western Virginia Water Authority operates the community's water and sanitary sewer systems.

The Virginia Department of Wildlife Resources maintains a public access point to the James River in the CDP. The Glen Wilton public access point is one of twelve that make up the Upper James River Water Trail, a blueway along the James River.

Transportation

Air
The Greenbrier Valley Airport and Roanoke-Blacksburg Regional Airport are the closest airports with commercial service to the CDP.

Roads
 U.S. Route 220 is the closest highway to the CDP.

Rail
The CSX operated James River Subdivision runs through the CDP. The closest passenger rail service is located in Clifton Forge.

References

Populated places on the James River (Virginia)
Census-designated places in Botetourt County, Virginia
Census-designated places in Virginia